The 1968–69 Maltese First Division was the 54th season of top-tier football in Malta.  It was contested by 8 teams, and Hibernians F.C. won the championship.

League standings

Second Place tie-breaker
With both Floriana and Valletta level on 18 points, a play-off match was conducted to qualification for the Inter-Cities Fairs Cup

Results

References
Malta - List of final tables (RSSSF)

Maltese Premier League seasons
Malta
Premier